No Love to Give is a novel by F. J. Thwaites.

Plot
A woman, Janna, flees Czechoslovakia in 1968 and makes her way to Australia. She meets an Australian Vietnam War veteran.

References

External links
No Love to Give at AustLit

1969 Australian novels